Trask or TRASK (TRAnsistorized Sequence Calculator) was a semiconductor based computer that begun development by the Swedish Board for Computing Machinery from 1960 and that went into use in 1965.

History 
Swedish Board for Computing Machinery that had developed BESK began in 1960 the work to develop a new semiconductor based computer. The plan was to create a faster machine with the experiences from BESK as a foundation but built using semiconductors that since the invention of the transistor in 1947 had become useful for this purpose. TRASK went into service in 1965 and were used until 1980 when it was donated to the Swedish National Museum of Science and Technology where it were rebuilt and was put into operation for demonstrations.

Operating principle 
TRASK is a fully transistorized mainframe intended for scientific calculations.  It consists of central units in cabinets, two Facit ECM-64 carousel memories, Ampex memory unit (in a 19-inch rack, standing on top of the cabinets), paper tape readers, paper tape puncher, typewriter, maneuver panel and a desk.

Input- and output units were:
 Paper tape reader (in) 500-1000 characters/second. 5-8 channel strip
 Magnetic tape (in and out)
 Typewriter (out) circa 10 characters/second
 Paper tape puncher (out) circa 150 characters/second
 Teleprinter (out) 11 rader/sek, 160 tecken/rad
 Control panel (in and out)

Information technology in Sweden
Swedish inventions